Wallace Leschinsky (May 12, 1920 – September 20, 1976) was an American politician and businessman.

Born in Beloit, Wisconsin, Leschinsky served in the United States Army during World War II. He went to Rockford Business College in Rockford, Illinois and was a salesman and restaurant owner. In 1955, Leschinsky served in the Wisconsin State Assembly and was a Republican. He died in Beloit, Wisconsin.

Notes

1920 births
1976 deaths
Politicians from Beloit, Wisconsin
Military personnel from Wisconsin
Businesspeople from Wisconsin
Republican Party members of the Wisconsin State Assembly
United States Army personnel of World War II
20th-century American businesspeople
20th-century American politicians